Y Pris (English: The Price) is a Welsh television crime drama, produced by Fiction Factory for Welsh public service television station S4C. The series, described in its tagline as "The Sopranos by the seaside", is set in Carmarthenshire and follows the "tangled lives of a group of gangsters who hide their illicit dealings". The series was written and created by Tim Price.

The first series comprises thirteen episodes. It was filmed in March and April 2007. The second series, comprising eight episodes, was commissioned by S4C in 2008 and filmed later the same year for broadcast in 2009. The series is, together with Caerdydd, Cowbois ac Injans, and Con Passionate, part of S4C's drama editor Angharad Jones' drive to reach a younger audience for the station. The series' theme was written and recorded by Alabama 3 lead singer Rob Love. All twenty-one episodes are available to stream on S4C's website. All episodes are fully subtitled in both Welsh and English. Episodes from the second series also carry audio description.

Reception
In 2008, Y Pris was nominated for the Prix Europa in the "Best Drama Series" category. Y Pris has received five nominations for the 2008 Bafta Cymru awards: Best Screenwriter for Tim Price, Best Actor for Matthew Gravelle, Best Drama Director for Gareth Bryn, Best Sound for Gareth Meiron, Simon H. Jones, and Darren Jones, and Best Original Music Soundtrack for John Hardy and Rob Love. Y Pris won the Best Original Music Soundtrack award for John Hardy and Rob Love. At the 2009 Celtic Media Festival Awards, the series won the award for "Best Drama Series". At the 2009 Bafta Cymru awards, Y Pris was nominated for four awards, including Gareth Bryn for Best Drama Director, Peter Thornton for Best Director of Drama Photography, Nel Bat for Best Make-Up, and Haydn Pearce for Best Design.

Cast

 Matthew Gravelle as Lyn Edwards 
 Aled Pugh as Bryn Pritchard
 Jâms Thomas as Ieuan Morris 
 James Thomas as Twrch 
 Philip Madoc as Y "The President" Llywydd 
 Dyfrig Morris as Billy the Pimp
 Rhodri Meilir as Steve John 
 Mark Lewis Jones as Chief Constable Bryan Jones
 Nia Roberts as Kirsti O'Shea
 Gillian Elisa as Anne 
 Phylip Harries as Alan Philips 
 Gareth John Bale as Keith 
 Huw Ceredig as Rhidian Edwards 
 Menna Trussler as Mam Edwards 
 Dafydd Hywel as Clive Owen
 Sara Lloyd-Gregory as Llio Edwards
 Vincent Walsh as Fionn
 Gareth Pierce as Nicky (Series 2)

Supporting

 Mari Ann Bull as Chloe 
 Catrin Arwel as Ruth
 Gareth Milton as Ian Blake 
 William Thomas as Davey Eddy 
 Iwan John as PC Ray Richards 
 Rhodri Miles as PC Rory Brown
 Gerry O'Brien as Mr. O'Shea
 Alun ap Brinley as Prins William
 Iola Hughes as Julia 
 Rhys Parry Jones as Big Phil  
 Maria Pride as Tara  
 Sara Harris-Davies as Mrs. Blake 
 Gordon Warnecke as Agent Macintosh 
 Gareth Potter as Oscar 
 Heledd Baskerville as Caitlin Hughes
 Fran Brennan as Peter Perry 
 Owen Garmon as Preacher Gruffudd Hughes
 Bethan Morgan as Carla 
 Hannah Morley as Hannah 
 Mair Rowlands as Siwan
 Michael Smiley as Captain 
 Gareth Blake as Keith Bradbury
 Emily Tucker as "Mouse" Llygoden

Episodes

Series 1 (2007–2008)

Series 2 (2009)

References

External links
 Official Website
 
 Fiction Factory on MySpace

2000s British crime drama television series
2007 British television series debuts
2009 British television series endings
British drama television series
British crime drama television series
S4C original programming
Tinopolis